Ottawa is the capital city of Canada. It is located at the confluence of the Ottawa River and the Rideau River in the southern portion of the province of Ontario. Ottawa borders Gatineau, Quebec, and forms the core of the Ottawa–Gatineau census metropolitan area (CMA) and the National Capital Region (NCR).  Ottawa had a city population of 1,017,449 and a metropolitan population of 1,488,307, making it the fourth-largest city and fourth-largest metropolitan area in Canada.

Ottawa is the political centre of Canada and headquarters to the federal government. The city houses numerous foreign embassies, key buildings, organizations, and institutions of Canada's government, including the Parliament of Canada, the Supreme Court, the residence of Canada's viceroy, and Office of the Prime Minister.

Founded in 1826 as Bytown, and incorporated as Ottawa in 1855, its original boundaries were expanded through numerous annexations and were ultimately replaced by a new city incorporation and amalgamation in 2001. The municipal government of Ottawa is established and governed by the City of Ottawa Act of the Government of Ontario, and has an elected city council across 24 wards and a mayor elected city-wide.

Ottawa has the most educated population among Canadian cities and is home to a number of colleges and universities, research and cultural institutions, including the University of Ottawa, Carleton University, Algonquin College, the National Arts Centre, the National Gallery of Canada; and numerous national museums, monuments, and historic sites. It is one of the most visited cities in Canada, with over 11 million visitors in 2018.

Etymology 
The city name Ottawa was chosen in 1855 as a reference to the Ottawa River, the name of which is derived from the Algonquin , meaning 'to trade'. The Algonquin Anishinaabe previously occupied a large tract of land on which Ottawa was settled.

History

Early history 

Ottawa is situated on the traditional land of the Algonquins, a broad Indigenous people who are closely related to the Odawa and Ojibwe peoples.

The Ottawa Valley became habitable around 10,000 years ago, following the natural draining of the Champlain Sea. Archaeological findings of arrowheads, tools and pottery indicate that Indigenous populations first settled in the area about 6,500 years ago. These findings suggest that these Algonquin people were engaged in foraging, hunting and fishing, but also trade and travel. Three major rivers meet within Ottawa, making it an important trade and travel area for thousands of years. This period ended with the arrival of settlers and colonization of North America by Europeans during and after the 15th century.

European exploration and early development

In 1610, Étienne Brûlé, became the first documented European to navigate the Ottawa River, passing what would become Ottawa on his way to the Great Lakes. Three years later, Samuel de Champlain wrote about the waterfalls in the area and about his encounters with the Algonquin people.

The first non-Indigenous settlement in the area was created by Philemon Wright, a New Englander. Wright founded a lumber town in the area on 7 March 1800 on the north side of the river, across from the present-day city of Ottawa in Hull.  He, with five other families and twenty-five labourers, also created an agricultural community, which was named Wrightsville. Wright pioneered the Ottawa Valley timber trade (soon to be the area's most significant economic activity) by transporting timber by river from the Ottawa Valley to Quebec City.

In 1826, news of the impending construction of the Rideau Canal by the British military led to land speculators founding a community on the south side of the Ottawa River. The following year, the town was named after British military engineer Colonel John By who was responsible for the entire Rideau Waterway construction project. The Rideau canal provided a secure route between Montreal and Kingston on Lake Ontario. It bypassed a vulnerable stretch of the St. Lawrence River bordering the state of New York that had left re-supply ships bound for southwestern Ontario easily exposed to enemy fire during the War of 1812.

Colonel By set up military barracks on the site of today's Parliament Hill. He also laid out the streets of the town and created two distinct neighbourhoods named "Upper Town" west of the canal and "Lower Town" east of the canal. Similar to its Upper Canada and Lower Canada namesakes, historically "Upper Town" was predominantly English-speaking and Protestant whereas "Lower Town" was predominantly French, Irish and Catholic.

Bytown's population grew to 1,000 as the Rideau Canal was being completed in 1832. Bytown' early pioneer period saw Irish labour unrest that attributed to the Shiners' War from 1835 to 1845 and political dissension that was evident in the 1849 Stony Monday Riot. In 1855, Bytown was renamed Ottawa and incorporated as a city. William Pittman Lett was installed as the first city clerk, serving from 1844 to 1891, guiding Ottawa through 36 years of development, leading the hiring of key municipal roles, founding civic organizations, and proposing a set of by-laws for the city.

The selection of Ottawa as capital 
Selection of Ottawa as the capital of Canada predates the Confederation of Canada. The selection was contentious and not straightforward, with the parliament of the United Province of Canada holding more than 200 votes over several decades to attempt to settle on a legislative solution to the location of the capital.

The governor general of the province had designated Kingston as the capital in 1841. However, the major population centres of Toronto and Montreal, as well as the former capital of Lower Canada, Quebec City, all had legislators dissatisfied with Kingston. Anglophone merchants in Quebec were the main group supportive of the Kingston arrangement. In 1842, a vote rejected Kingston as the capital, and study of potential candidates included the then-named Bytown, but that option proved less popular than Toronto or Montreal. In 1843, a report of the Executive Council recommended Montreal as the capital as a more fortifiable location and commercial centre; however, the governor general refused to execute a move without a parliamentary vote. In 1844, the Queen's acceptance of a parliamentary vote moved the capital to Montreal.

In 1849, after violence in Montreal, a series of votes was held, with Kingston and Bytown both again considered as capitals. However, the successful proposal was for two cities to share capital status, and the legislature to alternate sitting in each: Quebec City and Toronto, in a policy known as perambulation. Logistical difficulties made this an unpopular arrangement, and although an 1856 vote passed for the lower house of parliament to relocate permanently to Quebec City, the upper house refused to approve funding.

The funding impasse led to the ending of the legislature's role in determining the seat of government. The legislature requested the Queen make the determination of the seat of government. The Queen then acted on the advice of her governor general Edmund Head, who, after reviewing proposals from various cities, selected the recently renamed Ottawa. The Queen sent a letter to colonial authorities selecting Ottawa as the capital, effective 31 December 1857. George Brown, briefly a co-premier of the Province of Canada, attempted to reverse this decision, but was unsuccessful. The Queen's choice was ratified by the Parliament in 1859, with Quebec serving as interim capital from 1859 to 1865. The relocation process began in 1865, with the first session of Parliament held in the new buildings in 1866, and the buildings were generally well received by legislators.

Ottawa was chosen as the capital for two primary reasons. First, Ottawa's isolated location, surrounded by dense forest far from the Canada–US border and situated on a cliff face, would make it more defensible from attack. Second, Ottawa was approximately midway between Toronto and Kingston (in Canada West) and Montreal and Quebec City (in Canada East) making the selection an important political compromise.

Other minor considerations included that despite Ottawa's regional isolation, there was water transportation access from spring to fall, both to Montreal via the Ottawa River, and to Kingston via the Rideau Waterway. Additionally, by 1854 it also had a modern all-season railway (the Bytown and Prescott Railway) that carried passengers, lumber and supplies the 82 kilometres (50 miles) to Prescott on the Saint Lawrence River and beyond.  Ottawa's small size was also thought to be less prone to politically motivated mob violence, as had happened in the previous Canadian capitals. Finally, the government already owned the land that eventually became Parliament Hill, which it thought would be an ideal location for the Parliament Buildings.

The original Parliament buildings, which included the Centre, East and West Blocks, were constructed between 1859 and 1866 in the Gothic Revival style. At the time, this was the largest North American construction project ever attempted and Public Works Canada and its architects were not initially well prepared for the relatively shallow-lying bedrock, and had to redesign architectural drawings, leading to delays. The Library of Parliament and Parliament Hill landscaping were completed in 1876.

Post-Confederation

Starting in the 1850s, entrepreneurs known as lumber barons began to build large sawmills, which became some of the largest mills in the world. Rail lines built in 1854 connected Ottawa to areas south and, from 1886, to the transcontinental rail network via Hull and Lachute, Quebec.  By 1885 Ottawa was the only city in Canada whose downtown street-lights were powered entirely by electricity. In 1889, the Government developed and distributed 60 "water leases" (still in use) to mainly local industrialists which gave them permission to generate electricity and operate hydroelectric generators at Chaudière Falls. Public transportation began in 1870 with a horsecar system, overtaken in the 1890s by a vast electric streetcar system that operated until 1959.

The Hull–Ottawa fire of 1900 destroyed two-thirds of Hull, including 40 percent of its residential buildings and most of the buildings of its largest employers along the waterfront. It began as a chimney fire in Hull on the north side of the river, but due to wind, spread rapidly throughout the widespread wooden buildings.  In Ottawa, it destroyed about one-fifth of the buildings from the Lebreton Flats south to Booth Street and down to Dow's Lake. The fire had a disproportionate effect on west end lower-income neighbourhoods. It had also spread among many lumber yards, a major part of Ottawa's economy. The fire destroyed approximately 3200 buildings and caused an estimated $300 million in damage (in 2020 Canadian dollars). An estimated 14% of Ottawans were left homeless.

On 1 June 1912, the Grand Trunk Railway opened both the Château Laurier hotel and its neighbouring downtown Union Station. On 3 February 1916, the Centre Block of the Parliament buildings was destroyed by a fire. The House of Commons and Senate was temporarily relocated to the recently constructed Victoria Memorial Museum, now the Canadian Museum of Nature until the completion of the new Centre Block in 1922. The centrepiece of the new Parliament Buildings is a dominant Gothic Revival-styled structure known as the Peace Tower.

The location of what is now Confederation Square was a former commercial district centrally located in a triangular area downtown surrounded by historically significant heritage buildings which include the Parliament buildings. It was redeveloped as a ceremonial centre in 1938 as part of the City Beautiful Movement and became the site of the National War Memorial in 1939 and designated a National Historic Site in 1984. A new Central Post Office (now the Privy Council of Canada) was constructed in 1939 beside the War Memorial because the original post office building on the proposed Confederation Square grounds had to be demolished.

Post-Second World War

Ottawa's former industrial appearance was vastly altered by the 1950 Greber Plan. Prime Minister Mackenzie King hired French architect-planner Jacques Greber to design an urban plan for managing development in the National Capital Region, to make it more aesthetically pleasing and a location more befitting for Canada's political centre. Greber's plan included the creation of the National Capital Greenbelt, the Parkway and the Queensway highway system. His plan also called for changes in institutions such as moving downtown Union Station (now the Senate of Canada Building) to the suburbs, the removal of the street car system, the decentralization of selected government offices, the relocation of industries and removal of substandard housing from the downtown. The plan also recommended the creation of the Rideau Canal and Ottawa River pathways.

In 1958, the National Capital Commission was established as a Crown Corporation through the National Capital Act. The commission's original mission was to implement the Greber Plan recommendations—which it conducted during the 1960s and 1970s. This marked the creation of a permanent political infrastructure for managing the capital region. Prior attempts to do so in the previous 50 years had been temporary in nature. These included plans from the 1899 Ottawa Improvement Commission (OIC), the Todd Plan in 1903, the Holt Report in 1915 and the Federal District Commission (FDC) which was established in 1927 with a 16-year mandate.

From 1931 to 1958, City Hall had been at the Transportation Building adjacent to Union Station (now part of the Rideau Centre). In 1958 a new City Hall opened on Green Island near Rideau Falls where urban renewal had recently transformed this industrial location into green space. In 2001, Ottawa City Hall returned downtown to a 1990 building on 110 Laurier Avenue West, the home of the now-defunct Regional Municipality of Ottawa-Carleton. This new location was close to Ottawa's first (1849–1877) and second (1877–1931) City Halls. This new city hall complex also contained an adjacent 19th-century restored heritage building formerly known as the Ottawa Normal School.

From the 1960s to the 1980s, there was a large increase in construction in the National Capital Region, which was followed by large growth in the high-tech industry during the 1990s and 2000s. Ottawa became one of Canada's largest high-tech cities and was nicknamed Silicon Valley North. By the 1980s, Bell Northern Research (later Nortel) employed thousands, and large federally assisted research facilities such as the National Research Council contributed to an eventual technology boom. The early adopters led to offshoot companies such as Newbridge Networks, Mitel and Corel.

In 1991, provincial and federal governments responded to a land claim submitted by the Algonquins of Ontario, regarding the unceded status of the land Ottawa sits on. Negotiations have been ongoing, with an eventual goal to sign a treaty that would release Canada from claims for misuse of land under Algonquin title, as well as affirm various rights of the Algonquins and negotiate other conditions for this title transfer.

Ottawa's city limits had been increasing over the years, but it acquired the most territory on 1 January 2001, when it amalgamated all the municipalities of the Regional Municipality of Ottawa–Carleton into one single city. Regional Chair Bob Chiarelli was elected as the new city's first mayor in the 2000 municipal election, defeating Gloucester mayor Claudette Cain. The city's growth led to strains on the public transit system and road bridges. On 15 October 2001, a diesel-powered light rail transit (LRT) line was introduced on an experimental basis. Known today as the Trillium Line, it was dubbed the O-Train and connected downtown Ottawa to the southern suburbs via Carleton University. The decision to extend the O-Train, and to replace it with an electric light rail system, was a major issue in the 2006 municipal elections, where Chiarelli was defeated by businessman Larry O'Brien. After O'Brien's election, transit plans were changed to establish a series of light rail stations from the east side of the city into downtown, and for using a tunnel through the downtown core. Jim Watson, the last mayor of Ottawa prior to amalgamation, was re-elected in the 2010 election.

In October 2012, the City Council approved the final Lansdowne Park plan, an agreement with the Ottawa Sports and Entertainment Group that saw a new stadium, increased green space, and housing and retail added to the site. In December 2012, City Council voted unanimously to move forward with the Confederation Line, a  light rail transit line, which was opened on 14 September 2019.

Geography

Neighbourhoods 

The present day city of Ottawa consist of the historic main urban area, as well as other urban, suburban and rural areas within the city's post-amalgamation limits.

Old Ottawa 
Old Ottawa refers to the former pre-amalgamation city, as well as the former city of Vanier, a densely populated, historically francophone, working class enclave, and the former village of Rockcliffe Park, a wealthy residential neighbourhood adjacent to the Prime Minister's official residence at 24 Sussex and the Governor General's residence. The old city includes the downtown core and older neighbourhoods to the east, west, and south. These vibrant neighbourhoods include the bustling commercial and cultural areas of Centretown, Lower Town, and Sandy Hill, the affluent tree lined neighbourhoods of The Glebe, Westboro, and New Edinburgh, and the historically blue-collar communities of Hintonburg, Mechanicsville, Carlington, and LeBreton Flats, with a mixture of housing types, artist lofts, and industrial uses. The old city also includes the ethnic enclaves of Chinatown and Little Italy.

Suburbs and outlying communities 

Modern Ottawa is made up of eleven historic townships, ten of which are from the former Carleton County and one from the former Russell County. Ottawa city limits are bounded on the east by the United Counties of Prescott and Russell; by Renfrew County and Lanark County in the west; on the south by the United Counties of Leeds and Grenville and the United Counties of Stormont, Dundas and Glengarry; and on the north by the Regional County Municipality of Les Collines-de-l'Outaouais and the City of Gatineau.

The main suburban areas extend a considerable distance to the east, west and south of the inner-city. These areas also include the former cities of Cumberland, Gloucester, Kanata and Nepean. The towns of Stittsville and Richmond within the former Goulbourn Township are to the southwest. Nepean as a suburb also includes Barrhaven. The communities of Manotick and Riverside South are on the other side of the Rideau River, and Greely, southeast of Riverside South.

A number of rural communities (villages and hamlets) are administratively part of the Ottawa municipality. Some of these communities are Burritts Rapids; Ashton; Fallowfield; Kars; Fitzroy Harbour; Munster; Carp; North Gower; Metcalfe; Constance Bay and Osgoode. Several towns are within the federally defined National Capital Region but outside the city of Ottawa municipal boundaries; these include communities of Almonte, Carleton Place, Embrun, Kemptville, Rockland, and Russell.

Architecture 

Influenced by government structures, much of the city's architecture tends to be formal and functional; the city is also marked by Romantic and Picturesque styles of architecture such as the Parliament Buildings' gothic revival architecture. Ottawa's domestic architecture contains single family homes, but also includes smaller numbers of semi-detached houses, rowhouses, and apartment buildings. Many domestic buildings in Centertown are clad in red brick, with trim in wood, stone, or metal; variations are common, depending on the cultural heritage of the neighbourhoods and the time they were built.

The skyline has been controlled by building height restrictions originally implemented to keep Parliament Hill and the Peace Tower at  visible from most parts of the city. Today, several buildings are slightly taller than the Peace Tower, with the tallest being the Claridge Icon at 143 metres. Many federal buildings in the National Capital Region are managed by Public Works Canada, which leads to heritage conservation in its renovations and management of buildings, such as the renovation of the Senate Building. Most of the federal land in the region is managed by the National Capital Commission; its control of much undeveloped land and appropriations powers gives the NCC a great deal of influence over the city's development.

Climate 
Ottawa has a humid continental warm summer climate (Köppen Dfb) with four distinct seasons and is between Zones 5a and 5b on the Canadian Plant Hardiness Scale.

Summers are warm and humid in Ottawa. On average there are 11 days across the three summer months of June, July and August that have temperatures exceeding .

Snow and ice are dominant during the winter season. On average, almost every day of January, February and March, have more than 5 cm of snowpack (29, 28, and 22 days respectively), and on average, approximately 12 days a year see 5 cm or more of snowfall, with 4 of those having over 10 cm.

An average 17 days of the year experience temperatures below . Spring and fall are variable, prone to extremes in temperature and unpredictable swings in conditions. The month of May, for example, sees a day below freezing about every other year, but sees days above 30 °C at about the same rate.

Annual precipitation averages around 750mm per year. Precipitation is spread out through the year, with some variation. May through November are the months more likely to see precipitation and major precipitation events, with each month having an average of 3 days of over 1 cm of precipitation, with December through April seeing on average 1–2 days. May through November have on average over 8 cm of precipitation per month, with peaks of approximately 9 cm in June and September. December through April have lower than 8 cm, with February being the driest month at an average of 5 cm of precipitation.

Ottawa experiences about 2,080 hours of average sunshine annually (45% of possible). Winds in Ottawa tend to come from the West, though eastward winds caused by lake-effect cells in afternoons are not unusual. Winds tend to be slightly more dominant during the winter.

Physical geography 

Ottawa is situated on the south bank of the Ottawa River and contains the mouths of the Rideau River and Rideau Canal. It connects the Saint Lawrence River on Lake Ontario at Kingston to the Ottawa River near Parliament Hill. It was able to bypass the unnavigable sections of the Cataraqui and Rideau rivers and various small lakes along the waterway due to flooding techniques and the construction of 47 water transport locks.

Ottawa is situated in a lowland on top of Paleozoic carbonate and shale, and is surrounded by more craggy Precambrian igneous and metamorphic formations. Ottawa has had fluvial deposition of until and sands, leading to the widespread formation of eskers. There are limited distinct features arising from glacial deposits, but Ottawa was affected by the Late Winsconsian advance. Prior to the draining of the Champlain Sea, the area had high salinity. After the draining of the sea, the area had pine-dominated forests. Ottawa is located within the Western Quebec Seismic Zone, and while relatively inactive, the city does occasionally experience earthquakes.

Built environment 
During part of the winter season the Ottawa section of the canal forms the world's largest skating rink, thereby providing both a recreational venue and a  transportation path to downtown for ice skaters (from Carleton University and Dow's Lake to the Rideau Centre and National Arts Centre). On 29 June 2007, the Rideau Canal was recognized as a UNESCO World Heritage Site.

The older part of the city (including what remains of Bytown) is known as Lower Town, and occupies an area between the canal and the rivers. Across the canal to the west lie both Centretown and Downtown Ottawa, which share a border along Gloucester street. These core neighbourhoods contain streets such as Elgin and Bank, which fill the role of commercial main streets in the region.

Centretown is next to downtown, which includes a substantial economic and architectural government presence across multiple branches of government. The legislature's work takes place in the parliamentary precinct, which includes buildings on Parliament Hill and others downtown, such as the Senate of Canada Building. Important buildings in the executive branch include the Office of the Prime Minister and Privy Council as well as many civil service buildings. The Supreme Court of Canada building can also be found in this area.

Across the Ottawa River, which forms the border between Ontario and Quebec, lies the city of Gatineau, itself the result of amalgamation of the former Quebec cities of Hull and Aylmer. Although formally and administratively separate cities in two separate provinces, Ottawa and Gatineau (along with a number of nearby municipalities) collectively constitute the National Capital Region, which is considered a single metropolitan area. One federal Crown corporation, the National Capital Commission, or NCC, has significant land holdings in both cities, including sites of historical and touristic importance. The NCC, through its responsibility for planning and development of these lands, has a key role in shaping the development of the city. Around the main urban area is an extensive greenbelt, administered by the NCC for conservation and leisure, and comprising mostly forest, farmland and marshland.

Demographics 

Ottawa's median age of 40.1 is both below the provincial and national averages as of 2016. Youths under 15 years constituted 16.7% of the total population in 2016, while those of retirement age (65 years and older) made up 15.4%.

The 2021 census reported that immigrants (individuals born outside Canada) comprise 259,215 persons or 25.9% of the total population of Ottawa. Of the total immigrant population, the top countries of origin were China (20,320 persons or 7.8%), India (16,200 persons or 6.2%), United Kingdom (14,760 persons or 5.7%), Lebanon (11,900 persons or 4.6%), Philippines (10,505 persons or 4.1%), United States of America (8,795 persons or 3.4%), Haiti (6,710 persons or 2.6%), Syria (6,370 persons or 2.5%), Vietnam (6,155 persons or 2.4%), and Iran (6,000 persons or 2.3%).

Race and ethnicity 
As of 2016, approximately 69.1% of Ottawa's population was European, while 4.6% were aboriginal and 26.3% were visible minorities (higher than the national percentage of 22.3%).

Religion
According to the 2021 census, religious groups in Ottawa included:
Christianity (528,700 persons or 52.8%)
Irreligion (316,740 persons or 31.6%)
Islam (98,920 persons or 9.9%)
Hinduism (20,300 persons or 2.0%)
Buddhism (10,800 persons or 1.1%)
Judaism (10,600 persons or 1.1%)
Sikhism (6,375 persons or 0.6%)
Indigenous Spirituality (445 persons or <0.1%)
Other (8,055 persons or 0.8%)

Around 65% of Ottawa residents describe themselves as Christian , with Catholics accounting for 38.5% of the population and members of Protestant churches 25%. Non-Christian religions are also very well established in Ottawa, the largest being Islam (6.7%), Hinduism (1.4%), Buddhism (1.3%), and Judaism (1.2%). Those with no religious affiliation represent 22.8%.

Language
Bilingualism became official policy for the conduct of municipal business in 2002, and 37.6% of the population can speak both languages as of 2016, making it the largest city in Canada with both English and French as co-official languages. Those who identify their mother tongue as English constitute 62.4 percent, while those with French as their mother tongue make up 14.2 percent of the population. In terms of respondents' knowledge of one or both official languages, 59.9 percent and 1.5 percent of the population have knowledge of English only and French only, respectively; while 37.2 percent have a knowledge of both official languages. The overall Ottawa–Gatineau census metropolitan area (CMA) has a larger proportion of French speakers than Ottawa itself, since Gatineau is overwhelmingly French speaking. An additional 20.4 percent of the population list languages other than English and French as their mother tongue. These include Arabic (3.2%), Chinese (3.0%), Spanish (1.2%), Italian (1.1%), and many others.

Economy

As of 2015, the region of Ottawa-Gatineau has the sixth-highest total household income of all Canadian metropolitan areas ($82,053), and the Ontario portion more directly overlapping the City of Ottawa has a higher household income ($86,451). The median household income after taxes in the City of Ottawa is $73,745 in 2016 was higher than the national median of $61,348. Ottawa's unemployment rate has remained below the national and provincial unemployment rates since 2006, with a rate of 5.2% in April 2022, low compared to the decade preceding. In 2019 Mercer ranks Ottawa with the third highest quality of living of any Canadian city, and 19th highest in the world. It is also rated the second cleanest city in Canada, and third cleanest city in the world.

Ottawa's primary employers are the Public Service of Canada and the high-tech industry, although tourism and healthcare also represent increasingly sizeable economic activities. The federal government is the city's largest employer, employing over 116,000 individuals from the National Capital Region. The national headquarters for many federal departments are in Ottawa, particularly throughout Centretown and in the Terrasses de la Chaudière and Place du Portage complexes in Hull. The National Defence Headquarters in Ottawa is the main command centre for the Canadian Armed Forces and hosts the Department of National Defence. During the summer, the city hosts the Ceremonial Guard, which performs functions such as the Changing the Guard.

As the national capital of Canada, tourism is an important part of Ottawa's economy, particularly after the 150th anniversary of Canada which was centred in Ottawa. The lead-up to the festivities saw much investment in civic infrastructure, upgrades to tourist infrastructure and increases in national cultural attractions. The National Capital Region annually attracts an estimated 22 million tourists, who spend about 2.2 billion dollars and support 30,600 jobs directly.

In addition to the economic activities that come with being the national capital, Ottawa is an important technology centre; in 2015, its 1800 companies employed approximately 63,400 people. The concentration of companies in this industry earned the city the nickname of "Silicon Valley North". Most of these companies specialize in telecommunications, software development and environmental technology. Large technology companies such as Nortel, Corel, Mitel, Cognos, Halogen Software, Shopify and JDS Uniphase were founded in the city. Ottawa also has regional locations for Nokia, 3M, Adobe Systems, Bell Canada, IBM and Hewlett-Packard. Many of the telecommunications and new technology are in the western part of the city (formerly Kanata). The "tech sector" was doing particularly well in 2015/2016. 
Nordion, i-Stat and the National Research Council of Canada and OHRI are part of the growing life science sector.

The health sector is another major employer, which employs over 18,000 people in the city. Business, finance, administration, and sales and service rank high among types of occupations. Approximately ten percent of Ottawa's GDP is derived from finance, insurance and real estate whereas employment in goods-producing industries is only half the national average. The City of Ottawa is the second largest employer with approximately 2,100 people employed by the Ottawa Police service, and 13,300 full-time equivalent non-police employees.

In 2016, Ottawa experienced an increase of 10,000 jobs over 2012 average growth that was relatively slower than in the late 1990s. All major clusters tracked by the city saw increases in employment between 2014 and 2019. Major areas of growth in the 2010s included local and federal administration, finance and accommodation. Between 2008 and 2020, there was growth in the number of government employees and a reduction in high-tech jobs, a reversal of previous trends from 2003 to 2008.

Ottawa already has the largest rural economy among Canada's major cities. In Ottawa, the rural economy contributes over $1 billion to the GDP. Agriculture alone accounts for $400 million, $136.7 million of which is farm-gate sales. Rural economic activity includes agriculture, retail sales, construction, forestry and mining (aggregates), tourism, manufacturing, personal and business services, and transportation, to name a few. Rural employment expanded by a healthy 18% from 1996 to 2001.

Media 

Three main daily local newspapers are printed in Ottawa: two English newspapers, the Ottawa Citizen established as the Bytown Packet in 1845 and the Ottawa Sun, and one French newspaper, Le Droit. The city is also home to local stations of the television broadcast networks and systems CBC and CTV, as well as English and French radio stations.

In addition to the market's local media services, Ottawa is home to several national media operations, including CPAC (Canada's national legislature broadcaster) and the parliamentary bureau staff of virtually all of Canada's major newsgathering organizations in television, radio and print. The city is also home to the head office of the Canadian Broadcasting Corporation.

Education

Primary and secondary education 
Four main public school boards exist in Ottawa: English, English-Catholic, French, and French-Catholic. The English-language Ottawa-Carleton District School Board (OCDSB) is the largest board with 147 schools, followed by the English-Catholic Ottawa Catholic School Board with 85 schools. The two French-language boards are the French-Catholic Conseil des écoles catholiques du Centre-Est with 49 schools, and the French Conseil des écoles publiques de l'Est de l'Ontario with 37 schools. Ottawa also has numerous private schools which are not part of a board.

The Ottawa Public Library was created in 1906 as part of the Carnegie library system.  the library system had 2.3 million items at its 34 branches and two mobile libraries. Approximately 9.5 million loans were conducted in 2020, approximately 6.7 million physical loans and the remainder digital items.

Higher education and research 
Ottawa is known as the most educated city in Canada, with over half the population having graduated from college and/or university. Ottawa has the highest per capita concentration of engineers, scientists, and residents with PhDs in Canada. The city has two main public universities, and two main public colleges.

Carleton University was founded in 1942 to meet the needs of returning World War II veterans and later became Ontario's first private, non-denominational college. Over time, Carleton transitioned into the highly ranked comprehensive university it is today. The university's main campus sits between Old Ottawa South and Dow's Lake. Carleton's catholic affiliated university college, is the Dominican University College.
The University of Ottawa (originally named the "College of Bytown") was the first post-secondary institution established in the city in 1848. The university later grew to become the largest English-French bilingual university in the world. It is also a member of the U15, a group of highly respected research-intensive universities in Canada. The university's main campus is in the Sandy Hill neighbourhood, just adjacent to the city's downtown core. The University of Ottawa's catholic affiliated university college is St. Paul University.
Algonquin College is a college of applied arts and technology, founded in 1967. Its main campus is located in the City View neighbourhood of College Ward. The college serves the National Capital Region and the outlying areas of Eastern Ontario, Western Quebec, and Upstate New York. The college has satellite campuses in Pembroke and Perth, as well as four international campuses through their international offshore partnerships.
Collège La Cité is the largest French-language college in Ontario. Founded in 1989, its campus is located off the Aviation Parkway in the Carson Meadows neighbourhood. La Cité has satellite campus in Hawkesbury and a business office in Toronto.

Other colleges and universities in the metropolitan area are located in the neighbouring suburb of Gatineau, including the University of Quebec in Outaouais, Cégep de l'Outaouais, and Heritage College.

Public health 

There are six active general medical hospitals in the city of Ottawa: The Queensway Carleton Hospital, The Ottawa Hospital (Civic Hospital, General Hospital, Riverside Hospital), Montfort Hospital, and Children's Hospital of Eastern Ontario. Several specialized hospital facilities are also present, such as the world renown University of Ottawa Heart Institute, the Royal Ottawa Mental Health Centre, and Élisabeth Bruyère Hospital. There are also several hospitals and major medical centres in neighbouring suburban communities and commuter towns. The University of Ottawa Faculty of Medicine operates teaching hospitals in conjunction with partners throughout the city.

Ottawa is headquarters to numerous major medical organizations and institutions such as Canadian Red Cross, Canadian Blood Services, Health Canada, Canadian Medical Association, Royal College of Physicians and Surgeons of Canada, Canadian Nurses Association, and the Medical Council of Canada.

Culture and contemporary life

Traditionally the ByWard Market (in Lower Town), Parliament Hill and the Golden Triangle (both in Centretown – Downtown) have been the focal points of the cultural scenes in Ottawa. Modern thoroughfares such as Wellington Street, Rideau Street, Sussex Drive, Elgin Street, Bank Street, Somerset Street, Preston Street, Richmond Road in Westboro, and Sparks Street are home to many boutiques, museums, theatres, galleries, landmarks and memorials in addition to eating establishments, cafes, bars and nightclubs.

As Canada's capital, Ottawa has played host to a number of significant cultural events in Canadian history, including the first visit of the reigning Canadian sovereign—King George VI, with his consort, Queen Elizabeth—to his parliament, on 19 May 1939. VE Day was marked with a large celebration on 8 May 1945, the first raising of the country's new national flag took place on 15 February 1965, and the centennial of Confederation was celebrated on 1 July 1967. Queen Elizabeth II was in Ottawa on 17 April 1982, to issue a royal proclamation of the enactment of the Constitution Act. In 1983, Prince Charles and Diana Princess of Wales came to Ottawa for a state dinner hosted by then Prime Minister Pierre Trudeau. In 2011, Ottawa was selected as the first city to receive Prince William, Duke of Cambridge, and Catherine, Duchess of Cambridge during their tour of Canada.

Ottawa was featured in the short story collection For Your Eyes Only, by Ian Fleming.

Landmarks

There are 25 National Historic Sites of Canada in Ottawa, including the Château Laurier, Confederation Square, the former Ottawa Teachers' College and Laurier House. Many other properties of cultural value have been designated as having "heritage elements" by the City of Ottawa under Part IV of the Ontario Heritage Act.

Arts

Performing and visual arts 
The Ottawa Little Theatre, founded in 1913 as the Ottawa Drama League, is the longest-running community theatre company in Ottawa. Since 1969, Ottawa has been the home of the National Arts Centre, a major performing arts venue that houses four stages and is home to the National Arts Centre Orchestra, the Ottawa Symphony Orchestra and Opera Lyra Ottawa.

Established in 1975, the Great Canadian Theatre Company specializes in the production of Canadian plays at a local level.The cities museum landscape is notable for containing six of Canada's nine national museums, the Canada Agriculture and Food Museum, the Canada Aviation and Space Museum, the Canada Science and Technology Museum, Canadian Museum of Nature, Canadian War Museum and National Gallery of Canada. The National Gallery of Canada; designed by famous architect Moshe Safdie, it is a permanent home to the Maman sculpture. The Canadian War Museum houses over 3.75 million artifacts and was moved to an expanded facility in 2005. The Canadian Museum of Nature was built in 1905, and underwent a major renovation between 2004 and 2010, leading to a centrepiece Blue Whale skeleton, and the creation of a monthly nightclub experience, Nature Nocturne.

Cuisine
Ottawa is home to a number of regional dishes. A city with traditional French-Canadian roots, staples such as poutine are served throughout the city. However, many consider shawarma Ottawa's official dish. Ottawa is home to more shawarma shops than anywhere in the world outside the middle east. The city is also home to "Ottawa-style" pizza. Consisting usually of a thicker doughy crust, slightly spicy pizza sauce, with the toppings baked under a heavy layer of cheese, keeping the toppings soft. Beaver tails, are a fried dough pastry created in Ottawa in the 1970s. Le Cordon Bleu has a long established culinary arts institute in the central Ottawa neighbourhood of Sandy Hill. It is the only campus for Le Cordon Bleu in North America.

Festivals

Ottawa hosts a variety of annual seasonal activities—such as Winterlude, the largest festival in Canada, and Canada Day celebrations on Parliament Hill and surrounding downtown area, as well as Bluesfest, Canadian Tulip Festival, Ottawa Dragon Boat Festival, Ottawa International Jazz Festival, Fringe Festival, Capital Pride, and CityFolk Festival, that have grown to become some of the largest festivals of their kind in the world. In 2010, Ottawa's Festival industry received the IFEA "World Festival and Event City Award" for the category of North American cities with a population between 500,000 and 1,000,000.

Sports

Professional sports 
Sport in Ottawa has a history dating back to the 19th century. The city is currently home to four professional sports teams. The Ottawa Senators are a professional ice hockey team playing in the National Hockey League. The Senators history in Ottawa dates back to 1883, where the franchise would go on to win the Stanley Cup eleven times. The team is a member of the Atlantic Division and play their home games at the Canadian Tire Centre.

The Ottawa Redblacks are a professional Canadian Football team playing in the Canadian Football League. Formerly the Ottawa Rough Riders represented the city until 1996. With a history dating back to 1876, the team was one of the oldest and longest-lived professional sports teams in North America. The professional soccer club, Atlético Ottawa, play in the Canadian Premier League. The team was founded in by Spanish club Atlético Madrid, and along with the Redblacks, play their home games at TD Place Stadium. The Ottawa Blackjacks are a professional basketball team, playing in the Canadian Elite Basketball League, out of the TD Place Arena. The Ottawa Titans play professional baseball in the Frontier League at Raymond Chabot Grant Thornton Park. Ottawa was previously home to the Ottawa Lynx, a Triple-A club, as well as the Ottawa Champions, an independent baseball team in the Can-Am League.

Collegiate sports 
The University of Ottawa and Carleton University varsity teams compete in U Sports in various sports. Algonquin College and Collège La Cité teams compete in the OCAA.

The Carleton Ravens are nationally ranked in basketball and soccer. Carleton's men's basketball program is renown as the greatest of all time, having won 17 of the last 20 national championships. The Ottawa Gee-Gees are nationally ranked in basketball and soccer.

Non-professional and amateur sports 
Several non-professional teams also play in Ottawa, including the Ottawa 67's junior ice hockey team.
The city is home to an assortment of amateur organized team sports such as soccer, basketball, baseball, curling, rowing, ultimate, and horse racing. Casual recreational activities, such as skating, cycling, tennis, hiking, sailing, golfing, skiing, and fishing/ice fishing are also popular.

Government and politics

The City of Ottawa is a single-tier municipality, meaning it is in itself a census division and has no county or regional municipality government above it, and has no subsidiary municipalities to provide municipal services. Ottawa is governed by the 24-member Ottawa City Council consisting of 23 councillors each representing one ward and the mayor, Mark Sutcliffe as of the 2022 Ottawa municipal election, is elected in a citywide vote.

Along with being the capital of Canada, Ottawa is politically diverse in local politics. Most of the city has traditionally supported the Liberal Party in federal elections. The safest areas for the Liberals are the ones dominated by Francophones, especially in Vanier and central Gloucester. Central Ottawa is usually more left-leaning, and the New Democratic Party have won ridings there. Some of Ottawa's suburbs are swing areas, such as central Nepean. Another example of a swing area is Orleans, despite its often Liberal Party-aligned francophone population. Ridings further outside the city centre, such as those including Kanata, Barrhaven and rural areas, tend to be more conservative, both fiscally and socially. This is especially true in the former Townships of West Carleton, Goulbourn, Rideau and Osgoode, which are more in line with the conservative areas in the surrounding counties. Rural parts of the former township of Cumberland, with a large number of Francophones, traditionally support the Liberal Party, though their support has recently weakened.

At present, Ottawa is host to 130 embassies. A further 49 countries accredit their embassies and missions in the United States to Canada.

Transportation

Public transportation

Ottawa's public transit system is managed by OC Transpo. OC Transpo operates an integrated, multi-modal Rapid Transit system which includes:
 The O-Train light rail system. The four line public rail system includes two existing lines, and two lines which are currently under construction.
 Line 1, (Confederation Line), is an east–west line which operates medium-capacity trains and travels under the city's downtown core.
 Line 2, (Trillium Line), is a north–south light rail transit corridor connecting the airport and south end of Ottawa to Line 1 at Bayview station.
 Line 3, is an under construction mass-transit line that will run mostly in parallel to Line 1, splitting at Lincoln Fields station and continuing west. 
 Line 4, is an under-construction  airport link connecting the Trillium Line to the Ottawa International Airport
 A vast Bus rapid transit (BRT) system that uses a series of dedicated bus-only roadways named the Transitway, and reserved lanes on city streets and highways. The Transitway has long distances between stops and full station amenities (including platforms, walkways, fare gates, ticket booths, elevators and convenience stores). It connects Ottawa's suburbs to the inner city. The Rapid bus service network operates all day, 7 days a week, reaching the suburban communities of Kanata to the West, Barrhaven to the South-West, Orléans to the East, and South Keys to the South. 
 Over 190 local bus routes served by a fleet of ordinary, articulated and double-decker buses. Both OC Transpo and the Quebec-based Société de transport de l'Outaouais (STO) operate bus transit services between Ottawa and Gatineau. OC Transpo also operates a door-to-door bus service for disabled individuals known as ParaTranspo. There is a proposed LRT system that could link Ottawa with Gatineau.

Airports
The Ottawa Macdonald–Cartier International Airport is the city's principal airport. There are also three main regional airports Gatineau-Ottawa Executive Airport, Ottawa/Carp Airport, and Ottawa/Rockcliffe Airport.

Inter-city transportation
Ottawa station is the main inter-city train station operated by Via Rail. The city is also served by inter-city passenger rail service at Fallowfield station in the southwestern suburban community of Barrhaven.

Intercity bus services are currently provided by a number of carriers at various stops throughout the city, following the closure of the former Ottawa Central Station bus terminal on 1 June 2021. Major carriers include: Megabus, Ontario Northland, Autobus Gatineau, and Orléans Express.

Streets and highways
The City of Ottawa has over  lane-kilometres of road, as well as a series of freeways. The primary freeways are the east–west provincial Highway 417 (designated as the Queensway and part of the Trans-Canada Highway), Ottawa-Carleton Highway 174 (formerly Provincial Highway 17), Highway 7, and the north–south provincial Highway 416 (designated as Veterans' Memorial Highway), which connects to other 400-Series highways via the 401. From downtown there are also freeway connections to Autoroute 5 and Autoroute 50, in neighbouring Gatineau.

The city also has several scenic parkways and promenades, such as the Sir John A. Macdonald Parkway (formerly the Ottawa River Parkway), Colonel By Drive, Queen Elizabeth Driveway, the Sir George-Étienne Cartier Parkway (formerly the Rockcliffe Parkway), and the Aviation Parkway. The National Capital Commission manages ceremonial routes linking key attractions on both sides of the Ottawa River, including Confederation Boulevard.

Cycling and pedestrian network

Numerous paved multi-use trails, mostly operated by the National Capital Commission and the city, wind their way through much of the capital, including along the Ottawa River, Rideau River, and Rideau Canal. These pathways are used for transportation, tourism, and recreation. Because many streets either have wide curb lanes or bicycle lanes, cycling is a mode of transportation used by up to 2.5% of citizens, including in winter. This is the largest percentage of any major Canadian city.

Numerous downtown streets are restricted for pedestrians only. The entire length of Sparks Street was turned into a pedestrian mall in 1966. Since 1960, additional avenues, streets, and parkways, are reserved for pedestrian and bicycle use only on Saturdays, Sundays and on selected holidays and events. In 2021 city council unanimously approved the Byward Market Public Realm Plan to make the market area more  car-free and pedestrian friendly. From 2009 to 2015 the NCC introduced the Capital Bixi bicycle-sharing system. This continued until the program was taken over by company VeloGo from 2015 to 2018, when the partnership ceased. Scooter-sharing systems have since been introduced in the downtown and inner-city areas.

Notable people

See also

 Outline of Ottawa
 World national capitals
 List of Ottawa buildings
 Geography of Ottawa

Footnotes

References

Bibliography

External links

 
 
 

 
Capitals in North America
Cities in Ontario
High-technology business districts in Canada
Single-tier municipalities in Ontario
Populated places established in 1826
1826 establishments in Canada